The banana leaf is the leaf of the banana plant, which may produce up to 40 leaves in a growing cycle. The leaves have a wide range of applications because they are large, flexible, waterproof and decorative. They are used for cooking, wrapping, and food-serving in a wide range of cuisines in tropical and subtropical areas. They are used for decorative and symbolic purposes in numerous Hindu and Buddhist ceremonies. In traditional homebuilding in tropical areas, roofs and fences are made with dry banana-leaf thatch. Banana and palm leaves were historically the primary writing surfaces in many nations of South and Southeast Asia.

Applications in cuisine

Banana leaves are large, flexible, and waterproof. They impart an aroma to food that is cooked in or served on them; steaming with banana leaves imparts a subtle sweet flavour and aroma to the dish.  The leaves are not themselves eaten and are discarded after the contents are consumed.

Besides adding flavour, the leaves keep juices in and protect food from burning, much as foil does. In Tamil Nadu (India) leaves are fully dried and used as packing material for foodstuffs, and are also made into cups to hold liquids. The dried leaves are called 'Vaazhai-ch- charugu' (வாழைச் சருகு) in Tamil. Some South Indian, Filipino and Khmer recipes use banana leaves as a wrapper for frying. The leaves are later removed. In Vietnamese cuisine, banana leaves are used to wrap foods such as cha-lua.

By region

Austronesia

In Indonesian cuisine

In Indonesian cuisine, banana leaf is employed in cooking methods called pepes and botok; the banana-leaf packets of food are steamed, boiled, or grilled on charcoal. Banana leaves are also used to wrap several kinds of snacks kue (delicacies), such as nagasari or kue pisang and otak-otak, and also to wrap pressed sticky-rice delicacies such as lemper and lontong.

In Java, banana leaf is also used as a shallow conical bowl called "pincuk", usually to serve rujak tumbuk, pecel or satay. The pincuk secured with lidi semat (small thorn-like pins made from the coconut-leaf midrib). The pincuk fit in the left palm, while the right hand is used to consume the food. It also functions as a traditional disposable take-away food container. The cleaned banana leaf is often used as a placemat; cut banana-leaf sheets placed on rattan, bamboo or clay plates are used to serve food. Decorated and folded banana leaves on woven bamboo plates are used as serving trays, tumpeng rice cones, and holders for jajan pasar or kue delicacies.

In Malaysian and Singaporean cuisine
In Malaysian and Singapore cuisine, banana leaves are used to wrap certain kuih and otak-otak. Malay foods such as nasi lemak are also commonly wrapped with banana leaves before being wrapped with newspaper, as banana leaves add fragrance to the rice.

In Philippine cuisine

Banana leaves are the traditional method of serving food in Philippine cuisine, with rice and other dishes laid out on large banana leaves (a salo-salo, reminiscent of a buffet) and everyone partaking using their bare hands (kamayan). Another traditional method of serving food is by placing it on a banana-leaf liner placed over a woven bilao (a winnowing basket made of bamboo). The bilao is normally a farm implement used for removing chaff from grains, although there are now smaller woven trays or carved wooden plates of the same kind in Filipino restaurants used specifically for serving food. Banana leaves are also commonly used in wrapping food (binalot), and are valued for the aroma they impart to the food. Specific Philippine dishes that use banana leaves include suman and bibingka.

In Polynesian cuisine
The Hawaiian imu is often lined with banana leaves.

South Asia

South Indian cuisine and Bengali cuisine is traditionally served on a banana leaf, especially in the states of Andhra Pradesh, Telangana, Tamil Nadu, Karnataka, Kerala, Odisha, West Bengal and also in Sri Lanka. In these regions, it is customary to serve food on a banana leaf during festive occasions, and banana is often a part of the food served. In Maharashtra, on special occasions like Ganesh chaturthi, people eat off banana leaves. The banana leaf is also used for wrapping fish, which can then be steamed.

In Bengali cuisine
In Bengali cuisine, banana leaf is used to prepare Paturi, which is marinated and seasoned boneless fresh fish steamed and cooked inside a banana leaf and eaten on it. Commonly, Bhetki and Ilish are used in making Paturi. Bengali cuisine also have a great significance and sacred believe for having meal on a banana leaf.

In Indian cuisine
In India, white rice (or parboiled rice in authentic South Indian restaurants) is served on a banana leaf with an assortment of vegetables, pickles, appalam and other regional condiments (usually sour, salty or spicy). The banana leaf acts as a disposable plate and it in itself is not consumed. The choice of banana leaves is mainly due to the broad leaves as well as to the ubiquity of the plant in South India. Typically, only vegetarian gravy (e.g. sambar) will be served on the rice as it is meant to be a traditional vegetarian dish. However, sometimes boiled eggs, curried or fried meat or seafood are served as well. Traditionally, there will be two servings of rice with the first being served with gravy, side dishes and condiments whilst the second serving will be just rice with curd as a palate cleanser. Banana leaf meals are eaten by hand. Traditionally  only the right hand is used, and only the  tips of the fingers should touch the food. Any  part of the finger beyond the first knuckle or the palm must not touch the food. Parts of the Banana leaf meal etiquette also dictates that, after the meal, the guest must always fold the banana leaf inwards as a sign of gratitude to the host, even when the host is the proprietor of an eatery. However, when meals are served at funeral wakes, the leaf is folded outwards as a sign of condolence to the family of the deceased. Due to this, folding the leaf outwards is considered rude in any other circumstance.

Latin America

In Caribbean and Mexican cuisine
Guanimos are Dominican tamales made with cornmeal, stuffed with ground meat and wrapped with banana leaves.

In Puerto Rico pasteles are made primarily with fresh green banana dough stuffed with pork, and then wrapped in banana leaves which have been softened at the fire. Many rice dishes in Puerto Rico are cooked with banana leaves as a lid to add flavor and aroma. Fish and pork shoulder can be wrapped in plantain leaves and baked. Guanimes known as Puerto Rican tamales, cornmeal cooked with coconut milk and other ingredients, are wrapped in banana leaves. Sweet cassava tortillas and Puerto Rican arepas are laid on banana leaves for a few hours before cooking.

Mexican, and more specifically Oaxacan tamales and a local variety of lamb or barbacoa tacos are often steamed in banana leaves.  Banana leaves are used for wrapping pork in the traditional Yucatán dish Cochinita pibil.

In Central American cuisine

Vigorón' is a traditional Nicaraguan dish. It consists of a cabbage salad known as curtido (chopped cabbage, tomatoes, onions, and chile peppers marinated in vinegar and salt), boiled yuca, and chicharrones (fried pork with skin or with meat), wrapped in Banana leaf.  Variations of this dish are also found in Costa Rica.

Vaho (or Baho) is a mix of meat, green plantains and yuca cooked in banana leaves.

Tamales made throughout Central America are traditionally wrapped in banana leaves prior to cooking, which imparts a distinctive taste to the nixtamalized corn dough.

Nacatamal is made up mostly of nixtamalized corn masa (a kind of dough traditionally made from a process called nizquezar) and lard, but also includes seasonings such as salt and achiote (annatto).  Filling consists of seasoned pork meat, rice, a slice of potato, bell pepper, tomato, onion, olives, cilantro and/or spearmint sprigs, and on occasion, though less commonly, capers, raisins or fresh chile (red or green), all wrapped in banana leaves.  This dish is traditional to Nicaragua.

In Ecuadorian cuisine
Coast side region prepare dishes as Bollo, green plantain and peanut butter batter filled with fish or pork wrapped in a banana leaf, this is then baked in a brick oven or steamed. Manabi province prepare a dish called Tonga a chicken stew with rice dyed with achiote and peanut salsa, all this served on a banana leaf and then wrapped. Amazonian provinces has Maito where grilled fish is served with yucca and rice, wrapped in a banana leaves.

Other uses 
Banana leaves have also been proposed as a material out of which to make trays for airline meals, to reduce their environmental impact.

In tradition and religion

Banana leaves are used by Hindus and Buddhists as a decorative element for special functions, marriages, and ceremonies in southern India and Southeast Asia. Balinese Hindu prepare banana leaves as containers for floral offerings called canang to the hyang (spirits or deities) and gods. These floral offerings are then placed in various places around the house.

In Upper Myanmar, the banana leaf is used in handcrafting an elaborate multi-tiered offertory known as phetsein kundaung (ဖက်စိမ်းကွမ်းတောင်). In Thailand, banana leaf is used to create an offering bowl called krathong, an important element during festival of Loy Krathong on the full-moon day of the twelfth lunar month. The celebration is meant to pay respects to the Mother of Water called Phra Mae Kong Kha by floating a krathong on a body of water. Other Asian countries also have similar festivals such as in Myanmar, Laos, Cambodia, India and China. Krathong means lotus-shaped vessel, and in it are placed flowers with joss sticks and a candle in the middle. During Loy Krathong, people carry krathongs to the river. After lighting the candles and three joss sticks and making a wish, they will gently place their krathongs on the water and let them drift away with the current. People believed that krathongs will carry their wickedness and bad luck, and after that happiness will come to them. It is a time joy and merrymaking, dancing, singing, and activities with other people. People use banana leaves to make krathongs because it is an organic and natural material, and would decompose easily in the water.

As a writing surface

Banana and palm leaves were historically the primary writing surface in many nations of South and Southeast Asia. This has influenced the evolution of their scripts. The rounded letters of many of the scripts of southern India, Sri Lanka and Southeast Asia such as Oriya and Sinhala, Burmese, Baybayin, and Javanese, for example, are thought to have been influenced by this. Sharp angles and tracing straight lines along the vein of the leaf with a sharp writing implement would risk splitting the leaf and ruining the surface, so rounded letters, or letters with straight lines only in the vertical or diagonal direction, were required for practical daily use.

In such situations, the ribs of the leaves function as the dividing lines of ruled paper, separating lines of text. It is believed that this was so influential in the development of the still-undeciphered rongorongo script of Easter Island that the more elaborate wood tablets developed later were fluted to imitate the surface of a banana leaf.

Other uses
The leaves contain apiin which is used to make nanoparticle products.

See also
 Patravali, a dried leaf eating plate
 Banana leaf rice
 Strelitzia, a bird of paradise plant with similarly shaped leaves.
 Cochinita pibil, a Yucatán Mexican dish that wraps pork in banana leaves.
 Puto, bibingka, and suman, Filipino rice cakes which are traditionally wrapped in banana leaves.

References

 
Objects used in Hindu worship
Writing media
Indian culture
Southeast Asian culture
Desi culture
Bananas in culture